Dorcus is a genus of beetles in the family Lucanidae (stag beetles). Of the 30-odd species, most occur in Asia and India; two are found in southern Europe, and two species are from North America. Previously, specimens with serriform teeth on the mandibles and sable pigment were called Serrognathus whereas specimens with but a singular or multiple bulky notches on the mandibles and lustrous sable pigmentation were called Dorcus.

Species
The following species are members of the genus Dorcus:

 Dorcus alexisi Muret & Drumont, 1999  Cyprus
 Dorcus amamianus (Nomura, 1964)
 Dorcus antaeus Hope, 1842
 Dorcus apatani (Okuda & Maeda, 2015)
 Dorcus arfakianus (Lansberge, 1880)  Papua New Guinea
 Dorcus australicus (Bomans, 1985)  Australia
 Dorcus bandaensis Okuda, 2000  Indonesia
 Dorcus bashanus Huang & Chen, 2013  China
 Dorcus bhaskarai Hosoguchi, 2006  Indonesia
 Dorcus bolanus Nagel, 1928  Papua New Guinea
 Dorcus branaungi Nagai, 2000  Myanmar, China
 Dorcus brevis (Say, 1825)  North America
 Dorcus capricornis (Möllenkamp, 1909)  Solomon Islands
 Dorcus carinulatus Nagel, 1941  temperate Asia
 Dorcus cervulus (Boileau, 1901)  Vietnam, Thailand, China
 Dorcus chayuensis Huang & Chen, 2017  China
 Dorcus chucheni Huang & Chen, 2013  China
 Dorcus cuonaensis Huang & Chen, 2013  China
 Dorcus curvidens (Hope, 1840)
 Dorcus cylindricus Thomson, 1862  India
 Dorcus daedalion (Didier & Séguy, 1953)  China, southeast Asia
 Dorcus davidis (Fairmaire, 1887)  China, Mongolia
 Dorcus derelictus Parry, 1862  India
 Dorcus detanii Mizunuma, 1994  Indonesia
 Dorcus donckieri (Boileau, 1898)
 Dorcus dungkharpai (Okuda & Maeda, 2015)  India
 Dorcus egregius (Möllenkamp, 1898)  New Guinea, Solomon Islands
 Dorcus fujii Nagai & Maeda, 2010  Vietnam
 Dorcus fuliginosus (Didier, 1928)  India
 Dorcus furusui Baba, 2008  Indonesia
 Dorcus fuscescens Didier, 1931  Indonesia
 Dorcus ghiliani (Gestro, 1881)  Indonesia
 Dorcus gongshanus Huang & Chen, 2013  China
 Dorcus grandis Didier, 1926
 Dorcus haitschunus (Didier & Séguy, 1952)  China, North Korea, South Korea
 Dorcus hamidi Ikeda, 2005  Indonesia
 Dorcus hansi Schenk, 2008  China
 Dorcus hansteini (Albers, 1889)
 Dorcus hirticornis (Jakovlev, 1896)
 Dorcus hopei (Saunders, 1854)
 Dorcus hyperion (Boileau, 1899)
 Dorcus immundus Arrow, 1938  India
 Dorcus imrani (Okuda & Maeda, 2015)  India
 Dorcus insolitus (Didier, 1931)  Indonesia
 Dorcus intermedius (Gestro, 1881)  Oceanea
 Dorcus intricatus (Lacroix, 1981)  China
 Dorcus japonicus Nakane & Makino, 1985  Japan
 Dorcus kamijoi Fujita, 2009  Vietnam
 Dorcus katsurai Ikeda, 2000  Vietnam, China
 Dorcus kawamurai Fujita, 2010  India
 Dorcus kikunoae Hosoguchi, 2004  India
 Dorcus kirchneri Schenk, 2008  Indonesia
 Dorcus kyawi Nagai & Maeda, 2009  Myanmar, China
 Dorcus lachnosternus (de Lisle, 1972)
 Dorcus lacroixi (Bomans, 1973)  Malaysia
 Dorcus laevidorsis Fairmaire, 1888
 Dorcus lhoba Huang & Chen, 2013  China
 Dorcus lineatopunctatus (Hope, 1831)
 Dorcus linwenhsini Huang & Chen, 2013  China
 Dorcus linzhiensis Huang, Chen, Tao & Xiao, 2020  China
 Dorcus liyingbingi Huang & Chen, 2013  China
 Dorcus lvbu Huang & Chen, 2013  China
 Dorcus macleayi (Hope, 1845)  India
 Dorcus maryi Schenk, 2016  Papua New Guinea
 Dorcus mattisi Schenk, 2022
 Dorcus meeki Boileau, 1906
 Dorcus menba Huang & Chen, 2013  China
 Dorcus mencius (Kriesche, 1935)  China
 Dorcus mirabilis (Parry, 1864)  Malaysia
 Dorcus miwai Benesh, 1936  Taiwan and temperate Asia
 Dorcus mizunumai Fujita, 2010  Indonesia
 Dorcus monpa Okuda & Maeda, 2014  India
 Dorcus montivagus (Lewis, 1883)
 Dorcus motuoensis Huang & Chen, 2013
 Dorcus musimon Gené, 1836  southern Europe and North Africa
 Dorcus myinti Nagai & Maeda, 2009  Myanmar, China
 Dorcus nepalensis (Hope, 1831)  India
 Dorcus niasicus (Nonfried, 1895)  Indonesia
 Dorcus niedorfi Schenk, 2013  Myanmar
 Dorcus nitidus Kirsch, 1877  Indonesia, Papua New Guinea
 Dorcus nosei Nagai, 2000  Myanmar, China
 Dorcus parallelipipedus (Linnaeus, 1758)  (lesser stag beetle)  Palearctic, Mexico (introduced)
 Dorcus parallelus (Say, 1824)  North America
 Dorcus parryi Thomson, 1862  Indonesia
 Dorcus pemakoi Huang, Okuda, Maeda & Chen, 2017  China
 Dorcus peyronis Reiche & Saulcy, 1856  Europe, Middle East
 Dorcus pilosipes (Waterhouse, 1883)  Papua New Guinea, Solomon Islands
 Dorcus planithorax (Bomans, 1987)  Indonesia
 Dorcus prochazkai Schenk, 2003  Iran
 Dorcus rama (Boileau, 1897)  Indonesia
 Dorcus ratiocinativus Westwood, 1871  India
 Dorcus rectus (Motschulsky, 1857)  temperate Asia
 Dorcus reichei Hope, 1842  Indomalaya, China
 Dorcus ritsemae Oberthür & Houlbert, 1914
 Dorcus rubrofemoratus (van Vollenhoven, 1865)
 Dorcus rugosus Boileau, 1904  India
 Dorcus saiga (Olivier, 1789)
 Dorcus schenklingi (Möllenkamp, 1913)  Taiwan and temperate Asia
 Dorcus semenowi (Jakovlev, 1900)  China
 Dorcus sewertzowi Semenov, 1891  western and southwestern Asia
 Dorcus sinensis (Boileau, 1899)
 Dorcus striatipennis (Motschulsky, 1861)  Japan, Russia Far East
 Dorcus submolaris (Hope, 1845)  Indomalaya
 Dorcus sukkiti Fukinuki, 2004  Myanmar, China
 Dorcus suturalis Westwood, 1871  Afghanistan, Pakistan, India, Thailand
 Dorcus taiwanicus Nakane & Makino, 1985  Taiwan and temperate Asia
 Dorcus tanakai Nagai, 2002  China, Vietnam
 Dorcus taoi Huang & Chen, 2020  China
 Dorcus tatsuhikoi Fujii & Okuda, 2020  Vietnam
 Dorcus taurus (Fabricius, 1801)  (Serrognathus taurus in World Scarabaeidae Database)
 Dorcus tenuihirsutus Kim & Kim, 2010  South Korea, China
 Dorcus ternatensis Thomson, 1862  Indonesia
 Dorcus tianlongi Wang & Zhou, 2019  China
 Dorcus titanus   (Serrognathus titanus in World Scarabaeidae Database)
 Dorcus tityus Hope, 1842  Bangladesh, India
 Dorcus townesi (de Lisle, 1972)  Philippines
 Dorcus tricuspis (Ritsema, 1882)
 Dorcus tsunodai Fujita, 2009  Vietnam
 Dorcus ursulus Arrow, 1938  India, Bhutan, Myanmar, Thailand, China
 Dorcus velutinus Thomson, 1862  China, Indomalaya
 Dorcus vicinus Saunders, 1854  China
 Dorcus vidam (Nguyen & Schenk, 2015)  Vietnam
 Dorcus wardi Arrow, 1943  China, Myanmar
 Dorcus wickhami (Waterhouse, 1894)  Australia
 Dorcus wui Huang & Chen, 2013  China
 Dorcus yaksha Gravely, 1915
 Dorcus yamadai (Miwa, 1937)  Taiwan and temperate Asia
 Dorcus yongreni Huang & Chen, 2016  China
 Dorcus yuukae Bartolozzi & Nagai, 2017  Philippines
 Dorcus zhangmuensis Huang & Chen, 2013  China
 † Dorcus primigenius Deichmüller, 1881  Eocene of Czech Republic

References

External links 

 Live stag beetles and dried stag beetles large galleries.

Lucaninae
Lucanidae genera
Taxa named by William Sharp Macleay